The Air and Space Museum in Chernivtsi is one of the museums in Chernivtsi, Ukraine, dedicated to aviation's beginnings and space investigation in the territory of present-day Ukraine, as well worldwide.

The museum was opened in 1999. It is the city and regional center of aeromodeling.

The museum's exhibitions describe the beginnings of aviation, e.g., the first aircraft flight in Chernivtsi, realized by Czech engineer and constructor Jan Kašpar 23rd October 1910, as well as space exploration achievements, in particular, the life story of the first Ukrainian astronaut Leonid Kadenyuk whose family roots in Chernivtsi Oblast.  

Among the museum collection, there are many handmade aircraft models.

References

External links
 Air and Space Museum in Chernivtsi on Leonid Kadenyuk Center of young technicians (in Ukrainian)
 Air and Space Museum in Chernivtsi on buktour.icu (web guide through Bukovina) (in Ukrainian)
 Air and Space Museum in Chernivtsi on www.guide.cv.ua (web guide through Chernivtsi) (in Ukrainian)

1999 establishments in Ukraine
Museums established in 1999
Aerospace museums in Ukraine
Buildings and structures in Chernivtsi
Culture in Chernivtsi
Tourist attractions in Chernivtsi